Government Arts College, Thiruvananthapuram, also known as H.H. The Maharaja's College for Arts, is one of the oldest undergraduate and postgraduate, coeducational college located in Trivandrum, Kerala. It was established in the year 1948. The college is affiliated with Kerala University. This college offers different courses in arts and science.

Accreditation
The college is  recognized by the University Grants Commission (UGC).

Notable alumni
 G. Venugopal, Playback singer
 K. B. Ganesh Kumar, Actor, MLA, former transport minister government of kerala
 P.V. Jagadish Kumar, Actor
 Justice Bechu Kurian Thomas
 Keerikkadan Jose, Actor
 Chelangatt Gopalakrishnan, Film Journalist

References

External links
http://gactvm.org

Educational institutions established in 1948
Arts and Science colleges in Kerala
Colleges affiliated to the University of Kerala
Colleges in Thiruvananthapuram